Tang Yifen (Wade–Giles: T'ang I-fen, traditional: 湯貽汾, simplified: 汤贻汾, pinyin: Tāng Yífén); ca. 1778-1853 was a Chinese landscape painter and calligrapher during the Qing Dynasty (1644–1912).

Tang was born in the Jiangsu province. His style name was 'Ruoyi' and his sobriquets were 'Yusheng, Qing-ying monk and Zhouweng'. Tang painted both landscapes and ink plums in a style of great sensitivity, much in the same manner as Dai Xi. He also did calligraphy, especially running script.

References

External links
Tang Yifen in the collection of the Metropolitan Museum, New York

1778 births
1853 deaths
Qing dynasty landscape painters
Qing dynasty politicians from Jiangsu
Politicians from Changzhou
Suicides in the Qing dynasty
Suicides by drowning in China
Painters from Changzhou